Singles: Individually Wrapped is a greatest hits album by The Odds, released in 2000. The album contains singles from all four of the band's studio albums, as well as a rendition of the Christmas song "Kings of Orient" which the band recorded for the 1991 Christmas compilation A Lump of Coal.

Track listing
 "Someone Who's Cool" (3:17)
 "Truth Untold" (3:55)
 "It Falls Apart" (3:38)
 "Love Is the Subject" (4:43)
 "Jackhammer" (long version) (4:20)
 "Satisfied" (3:00)
 "Nothing Beautiful" (3:06)
 "Eat My Brain" (4:26)
 "Make You Mad" (4:07)
 "Wendy Under the Stars" (4:15)
 "Yes (Means It's Hard to Say No)" (single remix) (3:14)
 "I Would Be Your Man" (3:26)
 "King of the Heap" (single remix) (3:57)
 "Heterosexual Man" (3:32)
 "Mercy to Go" (5:18)
 "Kings of Orient (We Three Kings)" (4:26)

2000 greatest hits albums
Odds (band) albums